The 75th annual Locarno Festival opened on 3 August 2022 in Locarno, Switzerland with film Bullet Train by David Leitch. The 75th edition of Locarno Film Festival celebrated as diamond jubilee edition screened 226 films including 105 world premieres and 3 international premieres. It hosted retrospective screenings of Douglas Sirk’s films in its Retrospettiva section. 

The festival closed on 13 August with the Swiss-German documentary film Everything About Martin Suter. Everything but the Truth (Alles über Martin Suter. Ausser die Wahrheit.) by André Schäfer. Rule 34 by Julia Murat was awarded the Golden Leopard and The Adventures of Gigi the Law by Alessandro Comodin Special Jury Prize.

On the last day of the festival the Variety Piazza Grande Award went to French film Annie Colère by Blandine Lenoir, and the Prix du Public UBS, to Swiss-Belgian film Last Dance by Delphine Lehericey. 128,500 audience watched the screenings during the eleven days of the festival, along with the film professionals.

Events
Rotonda by la Mobiliare -Come together!
This event was held from July 29 to August 14. It is Locarno Film Festival’s communal space, featuring a wide range of entertainment and discoveries, open and accessible to all. It constituted following platforms:

 Music
 Art 
 Food and beverage

Exhibition SocialSim by Hito Steyerl

VR Experience: In collaboration with Geneva International Film Festival (GIFF)

Film Festival Tour by Ascona-Locarno

Exhibition René Burri

Skies by Kollektiv Beton @ BaseCamp

A 24h long talk on the Future of Attention

Jury

International competition
 Michel Merkt (Jury President), Producer and consultant
 Prano Bailey-Bond Welsh film director and writer
 Alain Guiraudie French film director and screenwriter
 William Horberg American film producer and chair emeritus of the Producers Guild of America on the East coast
 Laura Samani Italian director

Filmmakers of the present competition
 Annick Mahnert film festival curator, film producer and director of programming at Fantastic Fest, programs the Sitges International Fantastic Film Festival
 Gitanjali Rao Indian theatre actress, animator and film maker
 Katriel Schory Producer, senior consultant international co-productions

Leopards of tomorrow
 Walter Fasano Italian film editor and director
 Azra Deniz Okyay Turkish director
 Ada Solomon Romanian producer

First feature
 Boo Junfeng Singaporean filmmaker
 Shahram Mokri Iranian filmmaker
 Madeline Robert French producer

Green Pardo WWF
 Thierry Hugot Responsible for the Sustainability Study Group at Eurimages
 Sonia I. Seneviratne Swiss climate scientist, professor at the Institute for Atmospheric and Climate Science of the ETH Zurich
 Alessandro Rak Italian cartoonist, animator and director

Sections

Pre-festival
 No Dogs or Italians Allowed (Interdit aux chiens et aux Italiens) by Alain Ughetto

Piazza Grande 
Highlighted title indicates special award winning film.

International competition (Concorso internazionale) 
Highlighted title indicates award winner
Highlighted title indicates Golden Leopard winner

Filmmakers of the present competition (Concorso Cineasti del presente)

Leopards of tomorrow (Pardi di domani)
The section consists of three competitions and a special event with short films made during the Locarno Spring Academy: 
 International competition (Concorso internazionale): Works by emerging filmmakers from all over the world; 
 National competition (Concorso nazionale): Swiss productions; and 
 Competition of Author's Courts (Concorso Corti d’autore): short works by established directors
 Pardi di domani: Special Event

International competition (Concorso internazionale)

National competition (Concorso nazionale)

Competition of Author's Courts (Concorso Corti d’autore)

Pardi do domani: Evento speciale

Out of competition (Fuori concorso)

Open doors screenings

Open doors shorts
{| class="wikitable sortable mw-collapsible"
! Title
! Original title
! Country
! Director
|-
| colspan=2| Agwe
| Haiti 
| Samuel Frantz Suffren
|-
| colspan=2|Black Doll 
| Saint Vincent/Grenadines
| Akley Olton
|-
| colspan=2|Hojas de K. 
| Nicaragua, Costa Rica
| Gloria Carrión
|-
| colspan=2|Liremu Barana 
| Guatemala, Norway
| Elvis Caj Cojoc
|-
| colspan=2|Negra soy' 
| Honduras
| Laura Bermúdez
|-
| colspan=2|Out of many 
| Jamaica
| Rebecca Williams
|-
| colspan=2|Scars of Our Mothers’ Dreams 
| Grenada
| Meschida Philip
|-
| colspan=2|Techos Rotos 
| Dominican Republic 
| Yanillys Pérez
|-
| colspan=2|Tundra 
| Cuba
| José Luis Aparicio Ferrera
|-
| colspan=2|Umbra 
| Cuba
| Daniela Muñoz Barroso
|-

|}

History (s) of cinema (Histoire(s) du cinéma)

Retrospective (Retrospettiva)
Douglas Sirk

 Homages

Locarno Kids: screenings

Critics' week (Semaine de la critique)

Swiss panorama (Panorama Suisse)

Awards

Special Awards

 Leopard of Honour (Pardo d’onore Manor award): Matt Dillon was honored  with Leopard of Honour, the lifetime achievement award (Pardo d’onore Manor award) on August 4 at Locarno’s Piazza Grande.

 Locarno Kids Award  (la Mobiliare): Gitanjali Rao was honored  with Locarno Kids Award on August 8 at Locarno’s Piazza Grande accompanied by screening of her animated short film Printed Rainbow.

 Pardo d’onore Manor Leopard of Honour Manor: Kelly Reichardt

 Pardo alla carriera (Leopard Career Award): Costa-Gavras

 Vision Award Ticinomoda: Laurie Anderson
 Premio Raimondo Rezzonico: Jason Blum
 Excellence Award Davide Campari: Aaron Taylor-Johnson
 Leopard Club Award: Daisy Edgar-Jones

International competition

 Golden Leopard: Rule 34 by Julia Murat

 Special Jury Prize: The Adventures of Gigi the Law by Alessandro Comodin

 Best Direction Award: I Have Electric Dreams (Tengo sueños eléctricos) by Valentina Maurel
 Best Actor Award: Reinaldo Amien Gutiérrez for I Have Electric Dreams Best Actress Award: Daniela Marín Navarro for I Have Electric DreamsFilmmakers of the present competition
 Golden Leopard - Filmmakers of the Present: Nightsiren (Svetlonoc) by Tereza Nvotová
 Special Jury Prize: How Is Katia? (Yak Tam Katia?) by Christina Tynkevych
 Best Emerging Director: Juraj Lerotić for Safe Place (Sigurno Mjesto)
 Leopard for the Best Actress: Anastasia Karpenko for How Is Katia? Leopard for the Best Actor: Goran Marković for Safe Place Special Mention: Sister, What Grows Where Land Is Sick? (Den Siste VÅren) by Franciska Eliassen

Leopards of Tomorrow
International competition (Concorso internazionale)
 Pardino d’oro SRG SSR for the Best International Short Film: Sovereign	(Soberane) by Wara
 Pardino d’argento SRG SSR for the International Competition: Neighbour Abdi (Buurman Abdi) by Douwe Dijkstra
 Pardi di domani Best Direction Award – BONALUMI Engineering: Hardly Working by Total Refusal
 Medien Patent Verwaltung AG Award: Mulika by Maisha Maene
Special Mentions:
 Mother Prays All Day Long (Madar Tamame Rooz Doa Mikhanad) by Hoda Taheri

National competition (Concorso nazionale)

 Pardino d’oro Swiss Life for the Best Auteur Short Film: Euridice, Euridice by Lora Mure-Ravaud Pardino d’argento Swiss Life for the National Competition: The Newt Congress (Der Molchkongress) by Matthias Sahli, Immanuel Esser Best Swiss Newcomer Award: Michèle Flury, HeartbeatCompetition of Author's Courts (Concorso Corti d’autore)
 Pardino d’oro Swiss Life for the Best Auteur Short Film: 'Big Bang by Carlos SegundoFirst feature
 Swatch First Feature Award: Safe Place by Juraj LerotićSpecial MentionLove Dog by Bianca Lucas
 At Night the Cats Are Brown (De Noche Los Gastos Son Pardos) by Valentin Merz
Green Pardo WWF
 Pardo Verde WWF: Matter Out of Time by Nikolaus Geyrhalter
 Special Mentions:
 Sermone of the Fish (Baliqlara Xutbe) by  Hilal Baydarov
 It Is Night in America (É Noite Na America) by Ana Vaz
Piazza Grande

 Audience award (Prix du Public UBS): Last Dance by Delphine Lehericey 
 Variety Piazza Grande Award': Annie Colère by Blandine Lenoir

Independent jury awards

 Ecumenical Jury Award: Tales of the Purple House by Abbas Fahdel

 FIPRESCI Award: Stone Turtle by Ming Jin Woo

 European Cinemas Label Award: Tommy Guns by Carlos Conceição
Critics' week awards

 Grand Prix: The Hamlet Syndrome by Elwira Niewiera, Piotr Rosołowsk
 Premio Zonta Club Locarno: Ruthless Times – Songs of Care by Susanna Helke
 Marco Zucchi Award: Fledglings by Lidia Duda

Junior jury awards

 Junior Jury Award: Piaffe by Ann Oren
 Runner-up: Tommy Guns by Carlos Conceição
 Second runner-up: Serviam – Ich Will Dienen by Ruth Mader
 Environment Award: Sermon to the Fish by Hilal Baydarov
 Cineasti del Presente Award: Sister, What Grows Where Land is Sick?, by Franciska Eliassen
 Special Mention: Petites by Julie Lerat-Gersant
 Best International Short Film: Hardly Working by Total Refusal
 Best Swiss Short Film: Fairplay by Zoel Aeschbacher
 Special Mention: Les Dieux du Supermarché by Alberto Gonzalez Morales
 Open Doors Short Award: Techos Rotos'' by Yanillys Pérez

References

External links
 

Locarno
2022 festivals in Europe
2022 in Switzerland
Locarno Festival
August 2022 events in Switzerland